Straughn is a Scottish surname. Notable people with the surname include:

Andy Straughn (born 1959), British boxer
Seibert Straughn (born 1967), Barbadian sprinter
Wally Straughn (born 1957), American politician 
Yolande Straughn (born 1968), Barbadian sprinter